Summer Games is a 2011 Swiss drama film written and directed by Rolando Colla. The film was selected as the Swiss entry for the Best Foreign Language Film at the 84th Academy Awards, but it did not make the final shortlist.

Cast
 Fiorella Campanella as Marie
 Armando Condolucci as Nic
 Alessia Barela as Adriana
 Antonio Merone as Vincenzo
 Roberta Fossile as Marie's mother
 Marco D'Orazi as Agostino
 Aaron Hitz as Moritz
 Monica Cervini as Paola
 Francesco Huang as Lee
 Chiara Scolari as Patty

Filming
Filming started in Marina di Grosseto, Tuscany on 21 June 2010. Filming continued for seven weeks through the towns of Follonica, Gavorrano, Castiglione della Pescaia, Orbetello, Porto Santo Stefano and Monte Argentario in the Maremma.

See also
 List of submissions to the 84th Academy Awards for Best Foreign Language Film
 List of Swiss submissions for the Academy Award for Best Foreign Language Film

References

External links
 

2011 films
2011 drama films
2010s Italian-language films
Films set in Grosseto
Films set in Tuscany
Swiss drama films